The 2013 Kor Royal Cup was the 78th Kor Royal Cup, an annual football match contested by the winners of the previous season's Thai Premier League and Thai FA Cup competitions. The match was played at Suphachalasai Stadium, Bangkok, on 23 February 2013, and contested by the 2012 Thai Premier League champions Muangthong United, and Buriram United, the winner of the 2012 Thai FA Cup.

Details

Assistant referees:
 Lee Jung-Min (South Korea)
 Seong Mu-Hee (South Korea)
Fourth official:
 Chaiya Mahapab

See also
2013 Thai Premier League
2013 Thai FA Cup

Kor
2013